Santa Maria del Suffragio, commonly called the church of Anima Sante (Blessed Souls), is an 18th-century church in L'Aquila, central Italy.

It was begun on October 10, 1713, ten years after the 1703 L'Aquila earthquake damaged the Confraternita del Suffragio'''s former seat.

The Roman architect Carlo Buratti was charged with the work. In 1770 Gianfrancesco Leomporri added a Baroque façade, and years later, in 1805, the church was completed with a neoclassical dome by Giuseppe Valadier.

Being one of the most important churches of the city, Santa Maria del Suffragio also became one of the main symbols of the 2009 L'Aquila earthquake when, on April 6, 2009, it suffered serious damages and its dome was almost entirely pulled down by the quake.

The extensive damage to the church was a direct consequence of a lack of retrofitting. Although The church received a great deal of funding to be architecturally restored and aesthetically 'upholstered''' but lacked investment into the protection of its structural integrity; which is a disappointment as it was believed by many to be a building of cultural and architectural significance.

External links 

 The church of Anima Sante 
 YouTube video showing the dome's collapse 

Houses completed in 1805
Maria
Buildings and structures in L'Aquila
1713 establishments in Italy
Roman Catholic churches completed in 1805
1713 establishments in the Kingdom of Naples
19th-century Roman Catholic church buildings in Italy